Peter Langtoft, also known as Peter of Langtoft (died  1305) was an English historian and chronicler who took his name from the small village of Langtoft in the East Riding of Yorkshire.

Langtoft was an Augustinian canon regular at Bridlington Priory who wrote a history of England in Anglo-Norman verse, popularly known as Langtoft's Chronicle. The history narrates the history of England from the legendary founding of Britain by Brutus to the death of King Edward I. The first part of Langtoft's chronicle is translated from Wace's Roman de Brut, and the second part is drawn from a number of sources, including Henry of Huntingdon's Historia Anglorum. The third part is widely considered to be original work by Langtoft, and he includes in it details not recorded elsewhere such as the fate of Gwenllian, daughter of Llywelyn ap Gruffudd, Prince of Wales. On the whole, the chronicle is virulently anti-Scottish and famously contains nine 'songs', in both Anglo-Norman and Middle English, supposedly capturing the taunts between English and Scottish soldiers during the Anglo-Scottish conflicts of the late 13th and early 14th centuries.

Langtoft's Chronicle was the source of the second part of Robert Mannyng's Middle English Chronicle, completed around 1338. Piers Langtoft's Chronicle, as translated, illustrated and improved by Robert of Brunne, was also transcribed and published, in two volumes, by Thomas Hearne in 1725.

References

T. Wright, ed., The Chronicle of Pierre de Langtoft (London: Rerum Britannicarum medii aevii scriptores, 1859)
Jean-Claude Thiolier, ed., Édition critique et commentée de Pierre de Langtoft, Le règne d'Édouard Ier (Créteil : C.E.L.I.M.A., Université de Paris XII, 1989- ).

External links

  

 Manuscript of Langtoft's Chronicle in the British Library: British Library Catalogue of Illuminated Manuscripts, Royal 20 A II
 The Reign of Edward I, a chronicle written by Langtoft that is contained in a Trilingual compendium of texts in Cambridge Digital Library

Augustinian canons
14th-century English historians
Anglo-Norman literature
13th-century English historians
People from Bridlington
13th-century births
1300s deaths
English male writers